Begoña Narváez (born July 11, 1987 in Guadalajara, Jalisco), is a Mexican actress and model.

Career 
At 16 years old she joined Televisa's Centro de Educación Artística (CEA), one of Mexico's top acting schools. At the age of 19, Begoña Narváez made her debut as Isabel Flores in "Muchachitas como tú" (Teenage Girls Like You). It was a new version of the 1991 version produced by Emilio Larrosa. Muchachitas como tú was not the only telenovela Narváez has done Código Postal (Postcode) as Amy Adams, the girlfriend of Rafael Puentes. In 2010, Narváez played Marissa in "Zacatillo, un lugar en tu corazón" (Zacatillo: A New Beginning). Narváez played three different characters in La rosa de Guadalupe: Bibiana (in 2008), Jackie (in 2008) and Selma (in 2011). Narváez made her debut in American film From Prada to Nada. In 2012, she played in Mexican drama, Facenet as Paulina. Also, in 2012 Narváez played Barbara Montenegro in Rosa Diamante. As Barbara Montenegro, she played a vain woman in love with a man who constantly cheated on her but she was determined to keep him at all costs. Narváez played Lety in a Mexican romance entitled Me Late Chocolate. She can be seen in the upcoming Telemundo series La Impostora as Mariana Serrano.

Filmography

References 

1987 births
Living people
Mexican telenovela actresses
Mexican film actresses
Actresses from Guadalajara, Jalisco
Mexican female models
21st-century Mexican actresses